Richard Charles Hampton (born June 14, 1956) is a Canadian former professional ice hockey defenceman. He was born in Toronto, Ontario, but grew up in King, Ontario, and attended King City Secondary School.

Hampton started his National Hockey League (NHL) career with the California Golden Seals in 1974, staying with the team when it relocated to become the Cleveland Barons; he later played for the Los Angeles Kings. He left the NHL after the 1979–80 season. He played several more seasons in the minor leagues and retired from hockey after playing the 1983–84 season with the Rochester Americans.

Career statistics

Regular season and playoffs

International

External links
 

1956 births
Living people
Binghamton Dusters players
California Golden Seals draft picks
California Golden Seals players
Canadian ice hockey defencemen
Cleveland Barons (NHL) players
HC Ambrì-Piotta players
Houston Apollos players
King City Secondary School alumni
Los Angeles Kings players
National Hockey League first-round draft picks
New Brunswick Hawks players
Sportspeople from King, Ontario
Rochester Americans players
Ice hockey people from Toronto
St. Catharines Black Hawks players